Manuel Sala (born May 5, 1982) is an Angolan football player. He has played for Angola national team.

National team statistics

References

1982 births
Living people
Angolan footballers
Association football defenders
Angola international footballers